It was a fort in the Roman province of Dacia.

See also
List of castra

External links
Roman castra from Romania - Google Maps / Earth 
Castrele romane de la Bumbești Jiu, cea mai simplă soluție pentru dezvoltarea orașului

Notes

Roman legionary fortresses in Romania
History of Oltenia
Historic monuments in Gorj County